Carver Branch (also known as Carver Creek) is a stream in Newton County in the U.S. state of Missouri.

Carver Branch has the name of the local Carver family.

See also
List of rivers of Missouri

References

Rivers of Newton County, Missouri
Rivers of Missouri